= Next Space (video game) =

- Release: 1997

Next Space is a 1997 sci fi adventure video game developed by the Slovak company Magic Systems and published by Maxtech. It was published in Slovak and Czech language.
